Robert Alan Junell (born 1947) is a senior United States district judge of the United States District Court for the Western District of Texas.

Education and career

Born in El Paso, Texas, Junell received an Associate of Arts degree from New Mexico Military Institute in 1967, a Bachelor of Science degree from Texas Tech University in 1969. While at Texas Tech Junell was a linebacker for the Texas Tech Red Raider football team. Upon graduation, he joined the United States Army and served in Germany, achieving the rank of captain. He remained in the United States Army from 1970 to 1973. Upon discharge from active duty he obtained a Master of Science degree from the University of Arkansas in 1974, and a Juris Doctor from Texas Tech University School of Law in 1976. He was in private practice in Texas from 1977 to 2003. Junell was elected to the Texas House of Representative for 5 terms and served as Chairman of the House Appropriations Committee.

District court service

On January 7, 2003, Junell was nominated by President George W. Bush to a seat on the United States District Court for the Western District of Texas vacated by Hipolito Frank Garcia. Junell was confirmed by the United States Senate on February 10, 2003, and received his commission on February 12, 2003. He assumed senior status on February 13, 2015.

Sources

References

1947 births
Living people
Judges of the United States District Court for the Western District of Texas
United States district court judges appointed by George W. Bush
21st-century American judges
Texas Tech University School of Law alumni
United States Army officers
New Mexico Military Institute alumni
People from El Paso, Texas
Members of the Texas House of Representatives